Chard Rugby Football Club is an English rugby union team based in Chard in Somerset. The club run three senior men's teams, a Ladies' XV and the full range of junior teams. The first XV play in Tribute Western Counties West after being relegated from Tribute South West 1 West in 2016–17. The second XV play in Tribute Somerset 2 South The third XV in Tribute Somerset 3 South and the Ladies currently play Friendlies .

Season 2022/23

Following promotion from the Tribute Western Counties West division in 2021/22, Chard RFC will compete in the Regional 2 Tribute SW League in 2022/23.
Other teams in Regional 2 SW are Bridgwater & Albion, North Petherton, Sherborne, Truro, Crediton, Wadebridge Camels, Teignmouth, Newton Abbot, Wellington, St Austell and Sidmouth.

Honours
1st team:
 Somerset 3 champions: 1991–92
 Somerset 1 champions (2): 1995–96, 2002–03
 Gloucester Premier v Somerset Premier play-off winners: 2010–11
 Western Counties North champions: 2011–12
 South West 1 (east v west) promotion play-off winners: 2013–14

2nd team:
 Somerset 2 South champions: 2011–12
 Somerset 2 South champions: 2021-22

Colts team:
 Somerset U18s League champions: 2015–16

References

External links
 Official club website

Chard, Somerset
English rugby union teams
Rugby clubs established in 1876
Rugby union in Somerset
1876 establishments in England